Jim Green is an anti-nuclear campaigner with Friends of the Earth Australia. Green is a regular media commentator on nuclear issues. He has an honours degree in public health from the University of Wollongong and was awarded a PhD in science and technology studies for his analysis of the Lucas Heights research reactor debates.

Issues
Green and Peter Karamoskos (a nuclear radiologist) say there is growing scientific confidence in the linear no-threshold model for ionising radiation. The linear no-threshold model is used by Green to assert "Nuclear medicine is killing more people than the reactor and the isotope processing facility and everything else at Lucas Heights", adding "it is likely that of the people subjected to nuclear medicine in the year 2007 almost 500 will die from those nuclear medicine procedures at some time in the future." Balanced against this view is the benefit to tens of thousand of people in having the medical conditions correctly diagnosed and treated, often saving their lives, and the highly successful treatment of serious conditions such as cancer.

According to Green and Karamoskos, the alternative view, that low-level radiation is harmless, is limited to a small number of scientists "whose voice is greatly amplified by the nuclear industry".  In Australia, for example, "uranium mining and exploration companies such as Toro Energy, Uranium One and Heathgate Resources have sponsored speaking tours by scientists who claim that low level radiation exposure is not only harmless but actually good for you".

Further reading

PhD thesis
(1997) "Reactors, Radioisotopes & the HIFAR Controversy", Department of Science & Technology Studies, University of Wollongong, Australia

Recent publications
(2005, September) "Nuclear Power: No Solution to Climate Change"
(2006) "Australia, Uranium and Nuclear Power", International Journal of Environmental Studies, 63 (6), pp 845–857 (with J. Falk and G. Mudd)
(24 November 2006) "No to Howard's nuclear madness", Green Left
(3 August 2007) "James Lovelock and the big bang", Green Left
(2 November 2007) "Nuclear power and water scarcity", Green Left (with Sue Wareham)
(25 October 2009) Nuclear debate: A dangerous option that won't solve climate change Green Left.

See also
Anti-nuclear movement in Australia
Gavin Mudd
Jim Falk
Mark Diesendorf
David Noonan (environmentalist)
Dave Sweeney

References

External links
Yellowcake Country? Australia's uranium industry

Year of birth missing (living people)
Living people
Australian anti–nuclear power activists
Friends of the Earth
Sustainability advocates
University of Wollongong alumni